Mark Anthony Wells (born 15 October 1971 in Leicester) is an English former professional footballer who played as a defender in the Football League for Notts County, Huddersfield Town and Scarborough, and in non-league football for clubs including Dagenham & Redbridge, Gateshead, Worcester City, Harrogate Town, Hinckley Town and Pickering Town.

References

External links
 

1971 births
Living people
Footballers from Leicester
English footballers
Association football defenders
Notts County F.C. players
Huddersfield Town A.F.C. players
Scarborough F.C. players
Dagenham & Redbridge F.C. players
Gateshead F.C. players
Worcester City F.C. players
Harrogate Town A.F.C. players
Hinckley United F.C. players
English Football League players
Pickering Town F.C. players